Majorat is a French term for an arrangement giving the right of succession to a specific parcel of property associated with a title of nobility to a single heir, based on male primogeniture. A majorat (fideicommis) would be inherited by the oldest son, or if there was no son, the nearest relative. This law existed in some European countries and was designed to prevent the distribution of wealthy estates between many members of the family, thus weakening their position. Majorats were one of the factors easing the evolution of aristocracy.  The term is not used of English inheritances, where the concept was actually the norm, in the form of entails or fee tails. Majorats were specifically regulated by French law.  In France, it was a title of property, landed or funded, attached to a title instituted by Napoleon I and abolished 1848. 

Often the title could not be inherited if the property did not pass to the same person. Like English entails, the implications of majorats were often used in fiction to furnish complexity in plots; Honoré de Balzac was especially interested in them.

In the Polish–Lithuanian Commonwealth, majorat was known as ordynacja and was introduced in late 16th century by king Stephen Báthory. A couple of Polish magnates' fortunes were based on ordynacja, namely those of the Radziwiłłs, Zamoyskis, Wielopolskis.  was abolished by the agricultural reform in the People's Republic of Poland.

Each morgadio was established by specific deed on the basis of an indivisible estate and included rules of succession. In many cases, one of the requirements for inheritance was to pass down the family name of the founder of the morgadio and, occasionally, his or her coat of arms. Both men and women could institute and inherit, although in most cases succession was preferentially by male primogeniture. In some families many morgadios were accumulated as a result of marriage alliances, leading to a tradition of very long family names among the Portuguese nobility. Morgadios were abolished in 1863.

Basque majorats could be inherited by the oldest male or female child.

See also
 Minorat – same as majorat, only inheritance passed to the youngest child
 Fee tail - similar but different concept in common law

References

Property law